Many people have won more than one Pulitzer Prize. Nelson Harding is the only person to have received a prize in two consecutive years, the Pulitzer Prize for Editorial Cartooning in 1927 and 1928. American poet Robert Frost received the Pulitzer Prize four times from 1924 to 1943. William Allen White received the Pulitzer Prize twice but in two different categories: Journalism in 1923 for an editorial writing and posthumously in 1947 in the category Books, Drama, and Music for his autobiography.

Arts & Letters
 Four prizes
 Robert Frost, Poetry
 Eugene O'Neill, Drama
 Robert E. Sherwood, Drama (3) and Biography

 Three prizes
 Edward Albee, Drama
 Archibald MacLeish, Poetry (2) and Drama
 Edwin Arlington Robinson, Poetry (3)
 Carl Sandburg, Poetry (2) and History
 Robert Penn Warren, Poetry (2) and Fiction
 Thornton Wilder, Drama (2) and the Novel

 Two prizes

Journalism
This list is incomplete; you can help by expanding it.

 Four prizes
 Carol Guzy, Photojournalism, various subcategories
 David Barstow, Investigative Reporting (2), Public Service and Explanatory Reporting

 Three prizes
 Adnan Abidi , Photojournalism, Various Categories
 Walt Bogdanich, Specialized Reporting, National Reporting, Investigative Reporting
 Paul Conrad, Editorial Cartooning
 Edmund Duffy, Editorial Cartooning
 Thomas Friedman, International Reporting (2) and Commentary
 Herblock, Editorial Cartooning
 Rollin Kirby, Editorial Cartooning
 David D. Kirkpatrick, National and International Reporting, Public Service
 Jeff MacNelly, Editorial Cartooning
 William Snyder, Photojournalism, various subcategories

 Two prizes

References

 Note: List from Pulitzer Prize page.